Sir William James Fitzgerald (May 1894 – July 1989) was a British and Irish jurist who served as Chief Justice of the Supreme Court of Palestine during the time of the British Mandate.

Early life 
Fitzgerald was born in Cappawhite, County Tipperary, Ireland in May 1894. He attended Blackrock College and Trinity College Dublin.

During World War I he served in the Durham Light Infantry, being awarded the Military Cross and the Croix de Guerre.

In 1922 he was called to the Bar of Ireland (at the King's Inns, Dublin) and the Bar of England and Wales (at the Middle Temple, London.)

Colonial Service 
He was appointed Crown Counsel (a public prosecutor) in the colonial government of Nigeria in 1924. In 1932, he was appointed Solicitor-General in Northern Rhodesia (now Zambia); he became the Attorney General there in the following year. In 1937, he was appointed Attorney General of Palestine, at the time under British mandate. In 1944, he was appointed Chief Justice.

In 1945, following Arab claims that the Arab population was underrepresented in the Jerusalem city council, the High Commissioner, Lord Gort, appointed Fitzgerald to investigate the issue and offer a solution. On 28 August Fitzgerald issued his report, which proposed dividing the city into autonomous Jewish and Arab boroughs.

Fitzgerald was the last British Chief Justice of Palestine. Towards the end of the mandate he attempted to find a judicial post in England, but was unsuccessful. He was offered the presidency of the West African Court of Appeal (which was the court of appeal for the British colonies in West Africa) but he rejected the offer.

Career in the United Kingdom 
In March 1948, he sent all British judges in Palestine back to the United Kingdom, and in May 1948, following the end of the British mandate, he also returned. Eighteen months later, he was appointed president of the Lands Tribunal in London. This was his last judicial role, which he performed for fifteen years.

Evaluations 
The anonymous Irish Times obituarist observed of Sir William's service in Palestine that--

 ... Sir William is said to have remained "rigidly unpolitical and a man of moderation," whose "evident Irishness was perhaps a help" and who wrote extensively about the importance of Jerusalem's spiritual and cultural legacy. It is said that he was one of the very few "old Palestine hands" who was  equally welcome at the London embassies of Israel and Jordan after the creation of the State of Israel.

Sir William is reported, by the same source, to have favoured the establishment of a Palestinian state.

References

Further reading
Anon "Former Palestine Chief Justice Dies" Irish Times 10 July 1989 p 10
Assaf Likhovski (2006) Law and Identity in Mandate Palestine UNC Press
Haim Shenhav (2007) The mandate and its discontent, on love and betrayal, Am Oved

External links
Fitzgerald report and map Gilay Collectibles site

British Army personnel of World War I
20th-century English judges
Irish barristers
English barristers
1894 births
Administrators of Palestine
Recipients of the Military Cross
Recipients of the Croix de Guerre 1914–1918 (France)
Durham Light Infantry officers
1989 deaths
Jewish insurgency in Mandatory Palestine
Mandatory Palestine judges
Attorneys-General of Mandatory Palestine
Attorneys-General of Northern Rhodesia
Alumni of King's Inns